Believe is a compilation album by the American heavy metal band Savatage, released in Japan by the Zero Corporation label. Believe spotlights the four albums that have been released in Japan on that label. The album was intended to keep Savatage material on display in Japanese music stores. Although the song "Believe" was not released on a record distributed by Zero Corporation in Japan, the band felt it was vital for it to be included on the record, and subsequently it was. No unreleased material from the band was released on this compilation.

Track listing

External links
Liner Notes on the Savatage website

1998 compilation albums
Savatage albums
Albums produced by Paul O'Neill (rock producer)